Feridun Aybars (born 30 March 1952) is a Turkish former swimmer. He competed in two events at the 1972 Summer Olympics.

References

1952 births
Living people
Turkish male swimmers
Olympic swimmers of Turkey
Swimmers at the 1972 Summer Olympics
Place of birth missing (living people)
20th-century Turkish people
21st-century Turkish people